This article lists events that occurred during 1941 in Estonia.

Incumbents

Events
German troops took with help of the Forest Brothers Estonia over from the Soviets.
14 June – mass deportations by Soviet Union authorities take place in Estonia, Latvia and Lithuania.
22 June – Germany attacked Soviet Union, Estonian partisans (Forest Brothers) started revolting in Southern Estonia.
July – German troops enter Estonia.
28 August – sinking of a Soviet steamer with 3500 Soviet-mobilized Estonian men on board, 598 of them died.
1 December – Self-government of Estonia, headed by Hjalmar Mäe, is appointed by German military administration.

Births
22 January – Jaan Kaplinski, writer
25 November – Tiit Lilleorg, actor (d. 2021)
4 December – Leila Säälik, Estonian actress
6 December – Evald Hermaküla, Estonian actor and director (died 2000)

Deaths

References

 
1940s in Estonia
Estonia
Estonia
Years of the 20th century in Estonia